Stefania ginesi (tepuis treefrog) is a species of frog in the family Hemiphractidae. It is endemic to the Chimantá Massif, Venezuela.
Its natural habitats are humid rocky habitats on tepuis. While its range is restricted, it is a common species within its range. It can be found in crevices, caves, on open rock surfaces and adjacent peat bogs, in streams and rivers. Its range overlaps with the Canaima National Park.

References

ginesi
Amphibians of Venezuela
Endemic fauna of Venezuela
Taxa named by Juan A. Rivero
Amphibians described in 1968
Taxonomy articles created by Polbot
Amphibians of the Tepuis